Bay Ridge United Methodist Church, originally known as Grace Methodist Episcopal Church, was a historic Methodist church at 7002 Fourth Avenue and Ovington Avenue in Bay Ridge, Brooklyn, New York, New York.

It was designed by architect George W. Kramer.

It was built in 1899 in the Romanesque Revival style. It was built of green serpentine stone and trimmed in brown stone.  It featured a four-stage, crenelated clock tower.  Also on the property was the contributing Sunday School building built in 1926–1927.

The church was demolished October 21, 2008.

It was listed on the National Register of Historic Places in 1999.

References

Further reading 
 

Churches in Brooklyn
Properties of religious function on the National Register of Historic Places in Brooklyn
Churches completed in 1899
19th-century Methodist church buildings in the United States
United Methodist churches in New York City
Demolished churches in New York City
Demolished buildings and structures in Brooklyn